Dashan Township is a township in Lancang Lahu Autonomous County, Yunnan, China.

Administrative division
As of 2016, the township is divided into eight villages: 
 Dashan 
 Banpo 
 Youzhafang 
 Pingtian 
 Manghai 
 Tuanshan 
 Nanmei 
 Nandeba

History
In the Republic of China, it belonged to the Banghai Township and Daling Township.

After establishment of the Communist State, in 1950, the Dashan District was set up. It was merged into Donghe District in 1958. In 1984, Dashan District was demerged from Donghe District. It was incorporated officially as a township in 1988.

Geography
The township is located in northeastern Lancang Lahu Autonomous County. It is surrounded by Jinggu Dai and Yi Autonomous County on the northeast, Fudong Township on the northwest, Qianliu Yi Ethnic Township on the southeast, and Donghe Township on the southwest.

The Manghai River flows through the township.

Economy
The township's economy is based on nearby mineral resources and agricultural resources. The main crops of the region are grains, followed by corns and wheat. Economic crops are mainly camellia oleifera, tea, castanea mollissima, and coffee bean. The region abounds with iron, manganese, tin, copper, lead, zinc, and limestone.

Demographics

As of 2017, the National Bureau of Statistics of China estimates the township's population now to be 16,281.

References

Bibliography

Townships of Pu'er City
Divisions of Lancang Lahu Autonomous County